Cryptotreta is a genus of tephritid  or fruit flies in the family Tephritidae.

Species
Cryptotreta cislimitensis Steyskal, 1977
Cryptotreta pallida (Cole, 1923)

References

Tephritinae
Tephritidae genera
Diptera of North America